The Vietnam Championship Series (VCS) is a professional League of Legends esports league run by Riot Games and Garena. From 2013 to 2017, the VCS was a tier below Garena Premier League (GPL). In 2018, the VCS broke away from the GPL and became a separate tier one league. The Vietnamese teams have the opportunity to participate directly in international events of League of Legends organized by Riot Games without having to participate in the GPL.

History

2012–2013 
Before changing the name to the Vietnam Championship Series tournament that once named the Glorious Arena. Over 4 seasons from mid 2012 to the end of 2013 the tournament saw the dominance of Saigon Jokers with 3 times of champion and once champion of Full Louis. By the end of 2013, it was changed to Vietnam Championship Series.

2013–2015 
The first tournament was held in 2013 with the name Vietnam Championship Series without qualifying, the participating teams were invited by Vietnam Esports and the total prize value of the first tournament was VND 200,000,000. From the third season, the tournament starts with qualifiers and names are also changed to Vietnam Championship Series (VCS A) to distinguish them from the qualifying tournament of Vietnam Championship Series B (VCS B). In 2014, sponsored by Dell, the name of the prize was named Dell Championship Serie A (DCS A).

In 2015, the number of teams participating in VCS A was increased to 16 teams, playing in a round robin format with two turns (first and second round) scoring according to the Bo1 format. The team with the most points will be crowned champion. Saigon Fantastic Five has won the VCS A championship in spring 2015 and then the GPL spring 2015, becoming the first Vietnamese team to win the GPL.

2016
In 2016, VCS A made a big step when the tournament was officially part of the Riot Games tournament system, marking the official VCS A step up professionally. The organizing committee reduced the number of participating teams to 10, in return it will give 2 million VND / month to the coaches and athletes. The tournament format also changes accordingly: 10 rounds of 2 rounds count Bo1 points, 4 teams with the highest score will participate in play-offs to find champions. VCS A was also renamed Coca-Cola Championship Series (CCCS) under the sponsorship of Coca-Cola. By the summer of 2016, the Coca-Cola Championship Series was renamed the MountainDew Championship Series (MDCS) under the sponsorship of the Mountain Dew drinking water label.

2017
The number of teams participating in the competition continues to be reduced to 8, in return for the coach and athletes' salary increased to 3 million VND / month. The format of the tournament is also changed: 8 rounds of 2 rounds count Bo3 points, 4 teams with the highest score will participate in play-offs to find the champion.

2018
Riot Games directly participated in the tour operation, the tournament returned with the name Vietnam Championship Series, the total prize pool increased to 1 billion VND 200 million, the salary of coach and athletes increased to VND 4 million / month . In addition, VCS matches are held at GG Stadium - 6th Floor, Crescent Mall, District 7, Ho Chi Minh City built by Riot Games, instead of being organized online as before. Teams not based in Ho Chi Minh City will be supported by the organizers during the VCS Spring 2018. On 21 February 2018, VCS separated from GPL. This is a result based on the fact that in recent years VCS has always been the dominant force of the GPL. Especially at the two spring and summer events in 2017. Impressive competitions at MSI 2017 and World Championship 2017. Riot Games believes that this is a very appropriate time to get Vietnam away from the GPL to become a separate area. Changes in Vietnam's participatory international tournaments are as follows:
Vietnam (VCS) will be grouped with Turkey (TCL) and CIS (LCL) at Rift Rivals.
MSI: Will be expanded into a tournament for 14 teams.
World Championship: Definitely get a boot round.
VCS Championship team Spring Spring 2018 will increase to 100 million VND, bringing the total value to 500 million VND will be separated from GPL's reward Spring 2018 (The expected prize that the Vietnamese champion team attends GPL Spring) . However, this only applies to Spring, and from Summer onwards Vietnam will no longer relate to the GPL tournament.

Current participants

Competition format

Group stage
This period will have the participation of 8 teams, playing rounds of 2 rounds to find out the 4 strongest teams participating in the qualifying rounds. Matches of the Group Stage will take place in the Best of 3 format (3 games maximum), each game is played according to the Prohibition mode and Choose 5vs5 on the map Summoner's Rift.

Round knockout
4 teams will compete against each other in a ladder mode to find the champion: the 3rd and 4th teams will fight each other in the first match, the winning team will go on to meet the 2nd team and whoever wins this match will be competing Finalists meet the top team. Matches of this stage will take place in the form of Best of 5 (5 games maximum), each game is played according to the ban and Select 5vs5 on the map Summoner's Rift.

Past seasons

Statistics

Top-performing teams

Foreign players/Foreign coach

Players who have competed abroad

Casters

Present

Former

Individual Awards

Season MVP Standings

See also 
 Vietnamese teams in the League of Legends World Championship

References 

2013 establishments in Vietnam
Sports leagues in Asia
League of Legends competitions